The Bruno Klopfer Award is an award for lifetime achievement in personality psychology managed by the Society for Personality Assessment. It is the Society's most prestigious award and is named after the Society's founder Bruno Klopfer.

It was first awarded in 1965 as the "Great Man Award", but was renamed in 1970 after it was bestowed on a woman.

Recipients 
Source: The Society for Personality Assessment

See also
 List of psychology awards
 List of prizes named after people

References 

American psychology awards
Awards established in 1965